DC Universe: Justice League Unlimited Fan Collection is an action figure line based on the highly popular Justice League and Justice League Unlimited animated series. Though it was based on the show(s), the line has continued well beyond it, and has been re-branded in 2008, as a Target exclusive (in the US). Mattel announced in February 2011 that the line would come to an end later in the year with the final figures being released on the Mattel website including the final two three-packs, a seven-pack as well as the three exclusive Con three-packs being made available to the public.

History
The line itself has gone through many name changes.

Justice League/Justice League Mission Vision
The idea for the figures began as DC Direct sculpts by sculptor, Karen Palinko, which were later handed over to Mattel. They were then released under the Justice League line. They all sported nearly the same look as the original sculpts. Later on newer sculpts were made for all the heroes (except Hawkgirl) to add articulation and accommodate large accessories. Aquaman was later added, making the total number of heroes eight. Three villains were also produced, Lex Luthor, the Ultra-Humanite and Darkseid.

Justice League Unlimited
As the show moved onto newer territory, so did the figures. The basic concept was to sell smaller packaged collectible single figures (with repaints) and then a sort of quick-builder's 3-pack featuring three original characters with one or two of the original seven members included. The single figures were packed in with an accessory and a collectible card. The number of villains in the line were still few however, as only Sinestro, Amazo, Bizarro, and Brainiac were released. Justice League Unlimited, released in blue cards, as it is, lasted for two series (as Series 1 and 2). The rarest figure in the line is that of Green Lantern Hal Jordan. 100 copies of the figure were made and then the molds were destroyed. The figures were packaged on a special green and red card and autographed by Bruce Timm. The figures were given as a Christmas gift in 2005 to employees of the animation studio who worked on the show. Mattel has definitively stated, in multiple published reports, that there will be no Green Lantern Hal Jordan figures made available to the general public.

DC Superheroes
Re-branding the 2003 Batman toy line and creating a new Superman line in DC Superheroes, Mattel decided to take Justice League Unlimited into the new brand as well, effectively creating three sub-brands within one umbrella brand. The new packaging mirrored both Batman and Superman in design. The collectible cards in singles were removed and variants of figures that are not accurate to the show were dropped. This line basically offered original Batman, Superman and Flash for new collectors in original suits with various accessories and certain themed 3-packs such as three collectible Justice Lords packs, two Green Lantern Corps packs and a Martian Manhunter 3-pack with faithful character representations. The number of villains also began to increase to include characters such as Mirror Master, Copperhead, Lex Luthor, Star Sapphire, Volcana, Deadshot, and Joker; however, many of the villain figures (most notably Deadshot, Star Sapphire, and Volcana) suffered shoddy distribution by Mattel, making them among the rarest of the mass-marketed figures.

The yellow carded figures also lasted for two series, before DC Superheroes lines revamped their packaging into new purple cards with DC Comics inspired stars and dashes visible on the packaging. However the sixth series marked the return to non show-accurate repaints in single figure packs. The sixth series also marked the expansion of the Justice League Unlimited line slightly beyond its previous limits within the show, by introducing a more comic-accurate repaint of Bizarro, a Black Canary in fishnet stockings, and a Joker figure with a removable Red Hood mask accessory.

DC Universe Fan Collection
With the re-branding of DC Superheroes into DC Universe, the JLU line followed suit beginning with series 7. The future of the line was finally announced around the 2008 International Toy Fair in New York City. After most brick and mortar retail outlets abandoned JLU, Mattel and Target partnered up to bring the line out as an in-store exclusive. Outside the US, JLU has had only the one wave of 2009 singles surface at Toys r Us in Canada. These same single pack figures have also been showing up at discount in Big Lots stores throughout the USA.

The line continued with their comic-inspired repaints (such as Black-suit Superman, Classic Batman and Elongated Man), paint corrections (Red Tornado, Booster Gold, Dr. Fate and Zatanna), a continuation of Batman villains (from The New Batman Adventures, such as Bane, Scarecrow, Harley Quinn etc.) and brings to the table new lead characters (such as the Question and Captain Atom) and more background characters (from the Justice League and the Secret Society). By mid-2011, all of the expanded Justice League were made into figures except: The Creeper, Crimson Avenger (both costumes), Dr. Mid-Nite, Gypsy, Johnny Thunder & Thunderbolt, S.T.R.I.P.E. (both armours), and Speedy. Characters who were mentioned but didn't appear in any DCAU episodes such as Plastic Man and Cyborg started appearing in late 2009. Non-show characters to appear in the line include Superwoman, Firestorm, Ryan Choi Atom, Ultraman, Omac and the Doom Patrol.

Packaging
The line, in its various incarnations, has explored several types of packaging - single, 2-packs, 3-packs, 4-packs (as Justice League Toys "R" Us exclusives), 6-packs (as Target exclusives), and 7-pack (featuring the original members as Toys "R" Us exclusives both in the 3" and 4.5" scales.)

Once it was integrated into the DC Superheroes line, JLU sported redesigned orange packing, and followed suit when its 'sister' brand was redesigned with purple packaging in 2006. Since it was part of the DC Universe re-brand, the packaging was in a form of the DC Universe Classics packaging (including character bios) with animated touches placed on it. Beginning in March 2010, the packing changes to the DC Comics' 75th Anniversary brand.

4-packs have been available at the Mattel Collector site. These are not actual 4-packs per se, but singles that are bundled in four. These were discontinued in 2010 after the Justice Guild release, due to insufficient sales. Mattel continued selling exclusives on their site (though in a different format) starting with Lobo in April 2010.

Figures - 4.5"
The line features three sets of collectible figures, the most popular and voluminous being the 4.5" figures which now has over 70 unique characters, not including repaints. The other two lines are the 3" die-cast line and the 10" rotocast line.

Justice League

Series 1 - 2003
Batman
The Flash
Green Lantern
Superman

Series 2 - 2003
Batman
Batman (Black Variant)
The Flash
Green Lantern
Martian Manhunter
Superman
Superman (Dark Uniform)
Wonder Woman

Series 3 ("Attack Armor") - 2003
Attack Armor Batman
Attack Armor Green Lantern
Attack Armor Martian Manhunter
Attack Armor Superman

2-Pack Action Figures - 2003
Night Flight Batman & Superman
Superman vs. Assault Armor Lex Luthor

Deluxe Action Figures - 2003
Crime Bust Batman
Power Escape Superman
Superman Twin Talon - Released in Latin America Only
Wilson dog - Released in America Only

Vehicles - 2003
Batplane
Javelin-7 with Superman

Series 4 ("Mega Armor") - 2003
Mega Armor Batman
Mega Armor Flash
Mega Armor Superman
Hawkgirl

Playsets - 2003
The Watch Tower

Series 5 ("Mission Vision") - 2004
Batman
Darkseid (Dark Gray Face)
Darkseid (Light Gray Face)
The Flash
Green Lantern
Superman
Wonder Woman

Series 6 ("Mission Vision") - 2004
Batman
The Flash
Superman
Superman

Series 6 ("Mission Vision") Deluxe Action Figures - 2004
Aqua Sled Batman
Solar Cannon Superman

Series 6 ("Mission Vision") Vehicles - 2004
Batcycle
Flashcycle
Green Lantern Cycle
Javelin-7 With Flash
Javelin-7 With Superman

Series 7 ("Morph Gear") - 2004
Batman
The Flash
Green Lantern
Superman
Ultra Humanite

Series 8 ("Cyber Trakkers") - 2004
The Flash
Green Lantern
Martian Manhunter
Superman

Series 9 ("Silver Storm") - 2004
Hawkgirl
Superman

Exclusives - 2004
NASCAR - Batman
NASCAR - The Flash
NASCAR - Green Lantern
NASCAR - Martian Manhunter
NASCAR - Superman
NASCAR - Wonder Woman

Four Packs - 2004
Journey To Atlantis - Superman with Scuba Gear, Green Lantern with Scuba Gear, Flash with Scuba Gear, Aquaman
The Rise of Apokolips - Superman, Green Lantern, Wonder Woman, Darkseid

Justice League Unlimited

Series 1 - 2004

Singles
Batman (tech suit w/gas mask)
The Flash (tech suit)
Martian Manhunter (translucent)
Superman (tech suit w/kryptonite)
Wonder Woman (yellow choker/bracelets w/plastic lasso)

3-Packs
Batman, Elongated Man, Hawkgirl
Superman, Martian Manhunter (translucent), Brainiac
The Flash, Dr. Fate, Green Arrow

Series 2 - 2004

Singles
The Atom
The Flash (damaged uniform)
Green Lantern (circuit uniform)
Superman (damaged uniform)

3-Packs
Amazo, Starman, Superman
Aquaman, Wonder Woman, Batman
The Flash, Green Lantern, Red Tornado

Series 3 - Spring 2005

Singles
Batman (damaged uniform)
Brainiac
Dr. Fate
Green Arrow
Hawkgirl (black damaged uniform)

3-Packs
Atom Smasher, The Flash, Green Lantern
Booster Gold, Superman, Martian Manhunter
Dove, Hawk, Wonder Woman

Series 4 - 2005

Singles
Amazo (gold)
Anti-Amazo Flash
Anti-Amazo Superman
Starman

3-Packs
Aztek, Superman, Sinestro
Metamorpho, Batman, Wildcat
The Flash, Hawkgirl, Waverider

Series 5 - 2005

Singles
Aquaman
Booster Gold
Cyber Defenders: Superman
Cyber Defenders: Batman
Red Tornado

Series 6 - 2005

Singles
Atom Smasher
Dove
Hawk
Planet Patrol: Martian Manhunter
Planet Patrol: Wonder Woman

Target Exclusives - 2005
Batman, Bizarro, Wonder Woman
Black Canary, Green Arrow, Superman
Wonder Woman (Planet Patrol), Superman (silver highlights), Brainiac
Green Lantern, Martian Manhunter, Orion

Exclusives - 2005
Green Lantern: Hal Jordan

Vehicles - 2005
Batcycle
Flash Cycle
Green Arrow Cycle

DC Superheroes: Justice League Unlimited

Series 1 - 2006 (Orange Package)

Singles
Superman (w/Black Mercy)
Steel
Aztek
The Flash (w/rotor)
Supergirl

3-Packs
Green Lantern, Tomar Re, Kilowog
Lex Luthor (Injustice Gang jumpsuit), Copperhead, Mirror Master
Martian Manhunter, J'onn Jonnz, Martian Manhunter (clear)

Series 2 - 2006 (Orange Package)

Singles
Batman (w/ wings)
Waverider
Wildcat
Wonder Woman (w/blue cape)

3-Packs
Justice Lord Superman, Justice Lord Wonder Woman, Justice Lord Batman
Superman, Dr. Light, Aquaman (w/ cape)
Dr. Fate, Vixen, Hawkgirl

Series 3 - 2006 (Orange Package)

Singles
Batman
Superman (w/ super breath)
Rocket Red
Metamorpho
Copperhead

3-Packs
Katma Tui ("The Return" costume), Kyle Rayner, Arkkis Chummuck
Justice Lord Martian Manhunter, Justice Lord Green Lantern, Justice Lord The Flash
Zatanna, Batman, Shining Knight

Series 4 - 2006 (Orange Package)

Singles
Orion
Elongated Man
The Flash
Vigilante

3-Packs
Superman, Wonder Woman, The Demon Etrigan
K-Mart Exclusive 3 Pack: Superman (silver highlights), Supergirl (silver shirt), Steel
Toys-R-Us Exclusive 3 Pack: Justice Lord Batman ("tech circuits" deco), Justice Lord Hawkgirl, Justice Lord Superman ("tech circuits" deco)
Huntress, The Atom, Batman

6-Pack
Target Exclusive 6 Pack: Batman, Wonder Woman, Superman, Bizarro, Doomsday, Amazo (clear)

San Diego Comic Con Exclusives
SDCC 2006: Solomon Grundy
SDCC 2006: Solomon Grundy (Slimed Variant)
SDCC 2007: Green Lantern, Hawkgirl, The Ray

Series 5 - 2007 (Purple Package)

Singles
Superman
Huntress
The Flash
The Shade
Dr. Light

Re-Released Singles
Batman
Elongated Man
Orion
Steel
Supergirl
Vigilante

3-Packs
Lightray, Amazo, Nemesis
Batman, Wonder Woman, Superman
Huntress, The Atom, Batman

Series 6 - 2007 (Purple Package)

Singles
Wonder Woman (red sleeves)
Green Lantern (fluorescent green)
Shining Knight (w/sword)
Superman (red stripes)
Lex Luthor (bright green)

3-Packs
Superman, Dr. Light, Aquaman (with cape)
Superman, Wonder Woman, The Demon Etrigan,
Parasite, Stargirl, Aquaman (w/ two hands)
Green Arrow, Volcana, Hawk

Series 7 - 2007 (Purple Package)

3-Packs
Sand, Star Sapphire, Superman
Deadshot, Big Barda, Martian Manhunter
Obsidian, Vigilante, Brainiac

Series 8 - 2007 (Purple Package)

Singles
Batman
Kyle Rayner
Vixen
Sinestro

Re-Released Singles
Wonder Woman (w/blue cape)

3-Packs
Black Canary, The Joker, Batman
Hawkman, Alt. Flash, Rocket Red
Hawkman (Light Colored), Alt. Flash, Rocket Red
Superman (silver highlights), Supergirl (silver shirt), Steel

6-Pack
Target Exclusive 6 Pack:Justice Lord Batman, Justice Lord Wonder Woman, Justice Lord Superman, Bizarro (in non-show post-crisis colors), Doomsday (Lava), Amazo (with non-show Green Lantern effect)

Series 9 - 2007 (Purple Package)

Singles
Batman
Blue Devil
Zatanna
Mirror Master

3-Packs
Starman, The Flash, Dr. Fate
Justice Lord Batman ("tech circuits" deco), Justice Lord Hawkgirl, Justice Lord Superman ("tech circuits" deco)

Series 10 - 2007 (Purple Package)

3-Packs
Ice, Fire (regular version), Green Lantern
Ice, Fire (regular version), Green Lantern (fluorescent variant)
Green Arrow, Supergirl, Ultra Humanite
Mr. Miracle, Orion, Darkseid
Justice Lord Superman, Justice Lord Wonder Woman, Justice Lord Batman
Superman, Batman, Martian Munhunter

Exclusives
Toys "R" Us Exclusive: Original Members Collection
Target Exclusive 6 Pack: Batman, The Flash, Superman, Red Hood Joker (non-show costume), Gorilla Grodd, Lex Luthor (in non-show grey jumpsuit)

DC Universe: Justice League Unlimited

San Diego Comic Con 2008 Exclusive - July 2008
Giganta Two-Pack (4.75" and 8")

Wave One - August 2008 (Orange Package)

Singles
Superman (in non-show black costume)
Hawkman
Stargirl
Kilowog
Batman (in classic non-show detective comic costume)

Three-Packs
Green Lantern (fade), Captain Atom, Supergirl
Wonder Woman, The Flash, The Question
Fire (regular version), Green Lantern (fade), Ice

Six-Packs
The Secret Society
Batman
The Flash
Superman
Red Hood Joker (non-show costume)
Gorilla Grodd (corrected show accurate colors)
Lex Luthor (corrected show accurate colors)
Attack from Apokolips
Mr. Miracle
Superman
Forager
Mantis
Darkseid
Lashina

Wave Two - November 2008 (Orange Package)

Singles
Superman (with Phantom Zone projector)
Sinestro (non-show comic Sinestro Corps costume)
Wonder Woman (with lasso)
Bizarro (corrected show accurate style)
Batman (navy blue, with Wonder Pig)

Three-Packs
Galatea, Superman, Huntress
Green Lantern (bald), Captain Atom, Supergirl
Fire (regular version), Green Lantern (bald), Ice

Six-Packs
Legends of the League
Crimson Fox
Superman
Deadman
B'wana Beast
Commander Steel
Vibe
Secret Society II
The Key
Batman (Navy Blue)
Silver Banshee
Shadow Thief
KGBeast
Atomic Skull

Wave Three - First Quarter 2009 (Orange Package)

Singles
Green Lantern/John Stewart (in non-show classic comic Green Lantern uniform)
Booster Gold (corrected show accurate colors)
Superwoman (non-show character)
Parasite
Dr. Fate (corrected show accurate colors)

Three-Packs
Bruce Wayne (old), Batman (Terry McGinnis), Warhawk
Cheetah, The Shade, Lex Luthor (in prison jumpsuit)

San Diego Comic Con 2009 Exclusive - July 2009
Green Lantern Origins Three-Pack
Abin Sur (in non-show comic Green Lantern uniform)
Hal Jordan (in non-show flight suit)
Sinestro (in non-show comic Green Lantern uniform)

Wave Four - Fall 2009 (Orange Package)

Six-Packs
The League United
Mr. Terrific
Supergirl (adult)
Elongated Man (in 2nd non-show comic costume)
Obsidian
Superman
Hourman
Mutiny in the Ranks
Tala
Lex Luthor
Psycho Pirate
Dr. Polaris
Devil Ray
Gentleman Ghost

Three-Packs
Batman (Navy Blue), Amanda Waller, General Wade Eiling
Superman, Blackhawk, Wonder Woman
Black Vulcan (non-show character), Apache Chief (non-show character), Samurai (non-show character)

Wave Five - December 2009 (Orange Package)

Six-Packs
Justice League Eclipsed
Superman (w/ eclipsing gem pieces)
Eclipso
Wonder Woman (w/ eclipsing gem pieces)
Hawkgirl (w/ eclipsing gem pieces)
The Flash
Green Lantern (w/ eclipsing gem pieces)
Attack from Thanagar
Paran Dul
Hro Talak
Lt. Kragger
Green Lantern
Hawkgirl (Thanagarian soldier)
Batman (Navy Blue)

Three-Packs
Captain Boomerang, Captain Cold, The Flash
Silver Banshee, Superman (red eyes), Metallo
Cyborg (non-show character), Plastic Man, Mister Miracle

Wave Six - February 2010 (Orange Package)

Singles
Firestorm (non-show character)
Green Lantern/John Stewart (in non-show classic comic Green Lantern uniform)
Batman (Navy Blue)
Deadshot
Batman (in non-show black costume)

Wave Seven - February 2010 (Orange Package)

Singles
Green Arrow (corrected show accurate colors w/ Bow and Arrow)
Batman (corrected show accurate colors)
Aquaman (classic Superman: TAS costume)
Big Barda (w/ Mega Rod)
Star Sapphire

Wave Eight - May 2010

Singles (Anniversary Packaging)
Plastic Man
Superman (w/ Bottle City of Kandor)
Brainiac (New Krypton comic accurate)
The Atom (Ryan Choi *non-show character*)
Martian Manhunter (corrected show accurate colors)

Three-Packs (Orange Package)
Livewire, Superman, Weather Wizard
Batgirl, The Penguin, Nightwing

Wave Nine - July 2010 (Anniversary Packaging)

Singles
Flash (Barry Allen) (non-show character)
Mr. Terrific w/ T-spheres
Superman w/ Starro
Batman Beyond w/ Batarang
Power Ring (non-show character)

Wave Ten - Fall 2010 (Anniversary Packaging)

Singles
Ultraman (non-show character)
Red Tornado (corrected show accurate colors)
Captain Atom (in non-show comic accurate deco)
OMAC (non-show character)
Superman (Blue)
Superman (Red) (non-show characters)
Martian Manhunter (in non-show comic Final Crisis costume)

Three-Packs - 2011
Manhunter Robot, Green Lantern (fade), Manhunter Robot
Green Lantern (bald), Despero, Katma Tui (Hearts & Minds costume)
Warlord, Supergirl, Deimos
The Joker (Batman: TAS colors), Batman (Batman: TAS colors), Gray Ghost

MattyCollector.com Exclusives

Four-Packs of Singles
Gotham Criminal Four-Pack (February 15, 2009)
Harley Quinn
Scarecrow
Clock King
Bane
Legion of Superheroes Four-Pack (May 15, 2009)
Lightning Lad
Cosmic Boy
Saturn Girl
Brainiac 5
Marvel Family Four-Pack (August 17, 2009)
The Wizard Shazam (non-show character)
Black Adam (non-show character)
Mary Marvel (non-show character)
Captain Marvel
Doom Patrol Four-Pack (November 16, 2009)
Mento (non-show character)
Negative Man (non-show character)
Robotman (non-show character)
Elasti-Girl (non-show character)
Justice Guild of America Four-Pack (February 16, 2010)
The Streak
Tom Turbine
Green Guardsman
Black Siren

Three-Packs
Angle Man, Killer Frost, Firestorm (non-show character), convention exclusive 3-pack
Kyle Rayner, Goldface, Evil Star, convention exclusive 3-pack
Flash, Heatwave, Mirror Master, convention exclusive 3-pack
Adam Strange (non-show character), Animal Man (non-show character), Starman (non-show blue repaint) (September 15, 2011)
Golden Age Flash (non-show character), Golden Age Green Lantern (non-show character), Golden Age Hawkman (non-show character) (September 15, 2011)

Oversized Singles
Lobo (June 15, 2010)
S.T.R.I.P.E. (July 15, 2011)

Two-Packs
2 Parademons (November 15, 2010)
Darkseid & Kalibak (December 15, 2010)

Seven-Pack
 Dr. Midnight, Creeper, Johnny Thunder, Thunderbolt, Gypsy, Crimson Avenger, and Speedy (November 15, 2011)

Final release Three-Packs
These items were for sale on MattyCollector.com, one per month starting in July 2012
 Mongul, Wonder Woman, Batman (July 16, 2012)
 Future Static, Aquagirl, Micron (August 15, 2012)
 Herafter Superman, Vandal Savage, Batman (dark blue/grey) (September 17, 2012)
 Guy Gardner, Detective Batman, Martian Manhunter (show accurate) (October 15, 2012)
 Blue Beetle (Ted Kord), Booster Gold (show accurate), Translucent Fire (November 15, 2012)
 Toyman, Dr. Destiny, Firefly (December 17, 2012)

Notes

External links
- Matty Collector Justice League Unlimited
ToyOtter report on the jump from DC Direct to Mattel
Detailed JLU Figure Listings - Justice League
Detailed JLU Figure Listings - Justice League Unlimited
Detailed JLU Figure Listings - DC Superheroes: Justice League Unlimited
Detailed JLU Figure Listings - DC Universe: Justice League Unlimited

DC Comics action figure lines
2000s toys
Mattel
Justice League (TV series)
Justice League in other media